Maningrida, also known as Manayingkarírra and Manawukan, is an Aboriginal community in the heart of the Arnhem Land region of Australia's Northern Territory. It is on the North Central Arnhem Land coast of the Arafura Sea, on the estuary of the Liverpool River.

The Kunibídji (Ndjebbana) people are the traditional owners of this country. Major players in the town's economic and political life include the West Arnhem Regional Council, the Bawinanga Aboriginal Corporation, the Maningrida Progress Association, and Mala'la Health Service Aboriginal Corporation. Maningrida Arts & Culture, with its Djómi Museum, is a major art centre, known both nationally and internationally.

At the 2021 census, Maningrida had a population of 2,518.

History 

The Kunibídji (Ndjebbana) people are the traditional owners of this country. The name Maningrida is an Anglicised version of the Kunibídji name Manayingkarírra, which comes from the phrase Mane djang karirra, meaning "the place where the Dreaming changed shape". It is also known as Manawukan, the name assigned to it by the neighbouring Kuninjku people, which refers to a wetland area north-east of Maningrida.

The township of Maningrida dates back to just after World War 2. Syd Kyle-Little, working for the newly-formed Native Affairs Department, came up with the plan of a trading post to create a self-sufficient Aboriginal community, to stop the drift of Aboriginal people leaving their homelands and moving to Darwin. The intention was to make Maningrida self-sufficient and independent of welfare support. Jack Doolan became Kyle-Little's cadet patrol officer, and together they made the first white contact with the Aboriginal peoples since a hostile encounter with Matthew Flinders on his circumnavigation of Australia. Kyle -Little had intended to open other trading posts to serve other peoples on their own lands, but with a change in administration of the NT in 1950, the trading post was closed, and Kyle-Little resigned in disgust.

David and Ingrid Drysdale, former missionaries, established a new settlement in 1957. Maningrida became the first government-sponsored settlement, as opposed to a mission settlement, in Arnhem Land. An airstrip, school and hospital were built, and people from far and wide drifted in to live at the settlement. The government's motive was partly to quell the post-war migration of Aboriginal people from the Blyth and Liverpool Rivers regions into Darwin. Patrols went out to spread the word and encourage people to move into the settlement. Within a few years, the population had grown rapidly and the demographics of the area changed. This exacerbated traditionally strained relationships, and further tensions were created by the growing population of non-Indigenous people, known as Balanda, who were able to get jobs and decent housing. The number of Balanda grew from about 40 to 250 people between 1970 and 1974. The Aboriginal Land Rights (Northern Territory) Act 1976 gave Maningrida and other Aboriginal communities independence and self-government; however, Balanda still held most of the skilled and highly paid service positions.

From the 1960s onwards, the outstation movement led to many people returning to live on their traditional lands, which led to the establishment of the Bawinaga Aboriginal Corporation in 1970 (see below).

On the night of 24 April 2006 Cyclone Monica, the most severe cyclone ever to strike Australia at the time (later tied with Cyclone Marcus in 2018), passed just to the west of the community. The community was spared the full brute force of the category 5 cyclone and infrastructure damage was only light to moderate, despite a reported wind gust of 148 km/h at the town.

In 2015, the town became the subject of international news when it was incorrectly reported that "more than 25,000 venomous spiders suddenly descended upon [the town]". The confusion stemmed from a new article documenting a floodplain near the town with an extremely high concentration of tarantulas.

Location and demography
It is on the North Central Arnhem Land coast of the Arafura Sea, on the estuary of the Liverpool River.

At the 2016 census, Maningrida and its outstations had a population of 2,366, which included 309 people living on the 30 homelands (outstations) around Maningrida.

Governance, community organisations and facilities 
The West Arnhem Regional Council governs the local government area which includes Maningrida.

The Maningrida Progress Association was established in 1968 as a social welfare organisation, and registered as a Public Benevolent Institution in 2000. It provides financial assistance for things like housing, community services and projects, funerals, and other events.

The Bawinanga Aboriginal Corporation was established as resource agency for outstations in 1970, and was incorporated in 1979. Maningrida Arts and Crafts, the Bábbarra Women's Centre, Maningrida Wild Foods are all part of Bawinaga. In addition, the corporation manages a team of Indigenous rangers (Bawinanga Rangers – Land and Sea), various maintenance and retail enterprises, and community services.

The Mala'la Health Service Aboriginal Corporation runs a number of health care services for the community. In March 2021, the service completed its transition from governance by the NT Health Department to being a completely community-managed service run by the Corporation.

Maningrida College is the primary/secondary school.

Country and culture 
The north central Arnhem Land area serviced by Maningrida extends from Marrkolidjban in Eastern Kunwinjku country to the west, to Berriba in Dangbon country in the south, and over as far as Yinangarnduwa, or Cape Stewart, in the east.

It might be the most multilingual community, on a per capita basis, in the world. People speak Ndjébbana, Kuninjku, Kune, Rembarrnga, Dangbon/Dalabon, Nakkara, Gurrgoni, Djinang, Wurlaki, Ganalbingu, Gupapuyngu, Kunbarlang, Gun-nartpa, Burarra, and Australian English. Most people have command of at least three of these languages.

There is great cultural diversity, including a variety of different ceremonial practices, styles of art and design, music and dance.

Maningrida Arts & Culture

Maningrida Arts and Culture, also known as Maningrida Art Centre, represents an art movement built by contemporary artists in Maningrida and the surrounding homelands, with its roots in body art, rock art and cultural practices. Its Djómi Museum contains a collection of nationally and internationally significant artworks, collected since the 1970s with works dating back to the 1940s, including photographs taken by Axel Poignant in the 1950s. Hundreds of artists work at the centre, including internationally acclaimed contemporary artists John Mawurndjul, Owen Yalandja, Crusoe Kurddal, Lena Yarinkura, and Bob Burruwal.

Maningrida Arts and Culture was initially managed by the Maningrida Progress Association, but became part of Bawinanga Aboriginal Corporation in 1979.

Environment

Important Bird Area
Close to Maningrida is Haul Round Island, which has been identified as an Important Bird Area because of its seabird breeding colony - one of the largest in the Northern Territory.  The seabird eggs, mainly those of roseate and bridled terns, are often harvested as a food resource.

Climate

See also 

 Maningrida Airport

References

Further reading
 Bawinaga Rangers involved in a search for three lost men.

External links

Arnhem Land
Towns in the Northern Territory
Aboriginal communities in the Northern Territory
Australian Aboriginal freehold title